is a Japanese tarento, essayist, film director, television presenter, singer and actor. Sakagami entered the entertainment industry at the age of 3 as a child actor, marking him one of the longest tenured in the industry for his age.

Life and career
Sakagami was influenced to join the theatre group Gekidan Wakakusa at the age of three due to the death of his grandmother. He was enrolled by his parents in hopes of making friends, but instead flourished in acting and quickly rose to prominence in the industry.

At the age of four, Sakagami starred in several television dramas and variety programs, and was called a "child prodigy" with his natural acting skills. He continued acting as his main career path into his teens, when Sakagami's father went into bankruptcy and accumulating a large sum of debt from his addiction to gambling. Sakagami's parents divorced when he was 15, and he continued his acting career, with most of his earnings sent to pay off the family's debt. Due to his career in the entertainment world, he had difficulties keeping up with studies. Despite successfully enrolling into high school, Sakagami got into a fight on the first day of school and voluntarily expelled himself from school.

Sakagami's acting career came to a bottleneck in his teenage years as he was remembered mainly for his acting as a child. He began activities as a musician but found relatively little success. It was in 1988 that his career turned upwards with his role in the yakuza film Crazy Boys, propelling him into success once again.

In 1995, Sakagami was involved in a car crash into a utility pole when driving under the influence.

In 2012, Sakagami's performance on various variety shows garnered him popularity and success as a tarento. From then on, he became a prevalent figure and television personality in the entertainment industry, with hundreds of program appearances per year. He transitioned as a television presenter and MC, and is a regular on several ongoing variety programs.

Media

Television programs

Current regular programs
  (Fuji TV, 2014–present) MC
  (Fuji TV, 2015–present)
  (Nippon TV, 2013–present)
  (JLC, 2016–present)
  (TBS TV, 2016–present) MC alongside Rino Sashihara
  (Fuji TV, 2018–present) MC
  (Fuji TV, 2018–present) MC
  (TBS TV, 2018–present) MC

Current special programs
  (TV Asahi, 2013–present)
  (Nippon TV, 2014–present) MC
  (Nippon TV, 2014–present) MC
  (Nippon TV, 2014–present) MC
  (Nippon TV, 2014–present) MC
  (Nippon TV, 2016–present) Studio MC
  (TBS TV, 2016–present) MC alongside Hiromi
  (Fuji TV, 2017–present) MC
  (TV Tokyo, 2017–present)
  (TV Tokyo, 2017–present) MC
  (Fuji TV, 2017–present) MC

Television dramas
  (Fuji TV, 1972)
  (NHK G)
  (1972)
  (2001–2002) – as Tabuchi-sensei
  (TBS, 1972, 1973)
  (Nippon TV, 1974) – as Takeshi
  (Fuji TV, 1974) – as Tarokichi
  (Nippon TV, 1974) – as Shimataro
  (TBS, 1975) – as Akira Isobe
  (TBS)
 Season 7, Episode 13 (1976) – as Toko
 Season 25, Episode 7 (1997) – as Shinkichi
 Season 38, Episode 15 (2008) – as Toshisuke
 Season 40, Episode 3 (2009) – as Shinpachiro Sugaya
  (NHK, 1976) – as Taro Takahira
  (MBS TV, 1976) – as Kenkichi
  (TV Asahi, 1976) – as Jinichi
  (TBS, 1976) – as Tsutomu
  (TV Tokyo, 1977) – as Tsutomu
  (Nippon TV, 1977) – as Takashi Tomura
  (Fuji TV, 1978 – 1979) Leading role – as Taro
  (Nippon TV, 1979) – as Mitsuo Tashiro
  (Fuji TV, 1979) – as Sadahiko Go
  (Nippon TV, 1980)
  (TV Asahi-Shochiku, 1981)
  (NHK)
  (1981) – as Sakichi
  (1990) – as Ōyama Iwao
  (Nippon TV)
  (1981)
  (1983) – as Eldest son of Keisuke Takazawa
  (1990)
  (2004) – as Satoru Kobayashi
  (2005) – as Kotaro Hirose

Films
Edo Castle Rebellion (1991)
No Worries on the Recruit Front (1991)

Voice acting
The Angry Birds Movie, Red
The Angry Birds Movie 2, Red

Theatre

Commercials

Original videos

Radio

Web series

Works

Films

Dramas

Theatre

Bibliography

Discography

References

External links
 Avance – Sakagami's agency

1967 births
Living people
Japanese essayists
Japanese television presenters
Japanese television personalities
Japanese male voice actors
Japanese male child actors
Japanese male singers
Japanese film directors
Japanese theatre directors
Nippon Columbia artists
Singers from Tokyo